David Murray Big Band conducted by Lawrence "Butch" Morris is an album by David Murray released on the DIW/Columbia Records label in 1991. It features performances by Murray, Hugh Ragin, Graham Haynes, Rasul Siddik, James Zollar, Craig Harris, Frank Lacy, Al Patterson, Bob Stewart, Vincent Chancey, Khalil Henry, James Spaulding, Patience Higgins, Don Byron, John Purcell, Sonelius Smith, Fred Hopkins, Tani Tabbal conducted by Lawrence "Butch" Morris.

Reception
The Allmusic review by Scott Yanow awarded the album 4 stars, stating: "The David Murray big band, which can be undisciplined and even a bit out of control, is never dull. This generally brilliant effort has quite a few highpoints... easily recommended to listeners with open ears."

Track listing
 "Paul Gonsalves" - 17:37
 "Lester" - 9:56
 "Ben" - 10:09
 "Calling Steve McCall" (Morris) - 6:17
 "Lovejoy" (Harris) - 6:11
 "Istanbul" - 9:24
 "David's Tune" - 7:50
 "Let the Music Take You" (lyrics by Henderson, Harris) - 3:49
All compositions by David Murray except as indicated
Recorded March 5 & 6, 1991 at Clinton Recording Studios, NYC

Personnel
David Murray: tenor saxophone, bass clarinet
Hugh Ragin: trumpet
Graham Haynes: trumpet
Rasul Siddik: trumpet
James Zollar: trumpet
Craig Harris: trombone
Frank Lacy: trombone
Al Patterson: trombone
Bob Stewart: tuba
Vincent Chancey: French horn
Khalil Henry: flute, piccolo
James Spaulding: alto saxophone, flute
Patience Higgins: tenor saxophone, soprano saxophone
Don Byron: baritone saxophone, clarinet
John Purcell: alto saxophone, clarinet
Sonelius Smith: piano
Fred Hopkins: bass
Tani Tabbal: drums
Lawrence "Butch" Morris: conductor
Joel A. Brandon: whistle (Track 1)
Andy Bey: vocal (Track 8)

References

1991 albums
David Murray (saxophonist) albums
DIW Records albums